Leopold II (9 April 1835 – 17 December 1909) was the second King of the Belgians from 1865 to 1909, and the founder and sole owner of the Congo Free State from 1885-1908.

Born in Brussels as the second but eldest-surviving son of Leopold I and Louise of Orléans, Leopold succeeded his father to the Belgian throne in 1865 and reigned for 44 years until his death, the longest reign of a Belgian monarch to date. He died without surviving legitimate sons. The current Belgian king descends from his nephew and successor, Albert I. He is popularly referred to as the Builder King in Belgium in reference to the great number of buildings, urban projects and public works he commissioned.

Leopold was the founder and sole owner of the Congo Free State, a private project undertaken on his own behalf as a personal union with Belgium. He used Henry Morton Stanley to help him lay claim to the Congo, the present-day Democratic Republic of the Congo. At the Berlin Conference of 1884–1885, the colonial nations of Europe authorised his claim and committed the Congo Free State to him. Leopold ran the Congo by using the mercenary Force Publique for his personal gain. He extracted a fortune from the territory, initially by the collection of ivory and, after a rise in the price of natural rubber in the 1890s, by forced labour from the native population to harvest and process rubber.

Leopold's administration of the Congo Free State was characterized by atrocities and systematic brutality, including forced labour, torture, murder, kidnapping, and the amputation of the hands of men, women, and children when the quota of rubber was not met. In 1890 and in one of the first uses of the term, George Washington Williams described the practices of Leopold's administration of the Congo Free State as "crimes against humanity". These and other facts were established during Leopold's rule by eyewitness testimony, by on-site inspection from an international commission of inquiry, by the investigative journalism and activism of E. D. Morel, and by the 1904 Casement Report.

While it has proven difficult to accurately estimate the pre-colonial population and the amount by which it changed under the Congo Free State, estimates for the Congolese population decline during Leopold's rule range from 1 million to 15 million. The causes of the decline included epidemic disease, a reduced birth rate, and violence and famine caused by the regime.

In 1908, the reports of deaths and abuse, along with pressure from the Congo Reform Association and other international groups, induced the Belgian Government to take over the administration of the Congo from Leopold during the penultimate year of his rule. The Congo Free State was thus reconstituted as a new territory, the Belgian Congo.

Early life
Leopold was born in Brussels on 9 April 1835, the second child of the reigning Belgian monarch, Leopold I, and of his second wife, Louise, the daughter of King Louis Philippe of France. The French Revolution of 1848 forced his maternal grandfather, Louis Philippe, to flee to the United Kingdom. Louis Philippe died two years later, in 1850. Leopold's fragile mother was deeply affected by the death of her father and her health deteriorated. She died of tuberculosis that same year, when Leopold was 15 years old.

Leopold's sister Charlotte became Empress Carlota of Mexico in the 1860s. The British monarch at the time, Queen Victoria, was Leopold II's first cousin, since Leopold's father and Victoria's mother were brother and sister.

Marriage and family

At the age of 18, Leopold married Marie Henriette of Austria, a cousin of Emperor Franz Joseph I of Austria and granddaughter of the late Holy Roman Emperor Leopold II, on 22 August 1853 in Brussels. Lively and energetic, Marie Henriette endeared herself to the people by her character and benevolence. Her beauty earned her the sobriquet "The Rose of Brabant". She was also an accomplished artist and musician. She was passionate about horseback riding, to the point that she would care for her horses personally. Some joked about this "marriage of a stableman and a nun", the latter referring to the shy and withdrawn Leopold.

The marriage produced four children: three daughters and one son, Prince Leopold, Duke of Brabant. The younger Leopold died in 1869 at the age of nine from pneumonia after falling into a pond. His death was a source of great sorrow for King Leopold. The marriage became unhappy, and the couple separated after a last attempt to have another son, a union that resulted in the birth of their last daughter, Clementine. Marie Henriette retreated to Spa in 1895, and died there in 1902.

Leopold had many mistresses. In 1899, in his 65th year, Leopold took as a mistress Caroline Lacroix, a 16-year-old French prostitute, and they remained together until his death ten years later. Leopold lavished upon her large sums of money, estates, gifts, and a noble title, Baroness de Vaughan. Owing to these gifts and the unofficial nature of their relationship, their affair ironically lost Leopold more popularity in Belgium than any of his crimes in the Congo. Caroline bore two sons, Lucien Philippe Marie Antoine, Duke of Tervuren, and Philippe Henri Marie François, Count of Ravenstein. Their second son was born with a deformed hand, leading a cartoon to depict Leopold holding the child surrounded by Congolese corpses with their hands sliced off: the caption said "Vengeance from on high". They married secretly in a religious ceremony five days before his death. Their failure to perform a civil ceremony rendered the marriage invalid under Belgian law. After the king's death, it soon emerged that he had left his widow a large fortune in Congo securities, only some of which the Belgian government and Leopold's three estranged daughters were able to win back.

Early political career
As Leopold's older brother, the earlier crown prince Louis Philippe, had died the year before Leopold's birth, Leopold was heir to the throne from his birth. When he was 9 years old, Leopold received the title of Duke of Brabant, and was appointed a sub-lieutenant in the army. He served in the army until his accession in 1865, by which time he had reached the rank of lieutenant-general.

Leopold's public career began on his attaining the age of majority in 1855, when he became a member of the Belgian Senate. He took an active interest in the senate, especially in matters concerning the development of Belgium and its trade, and began to urge Belgium's acquisition of colonies. Leopold traveled abroad extensively from 1854 to 1865, visiting India, China, Egypt, and the countries on the Mediterranean coast of Africa. His father died on 10 December 1865, and Leopold took the oath of office on 17 December, at the age of 30.

Domestic reign

Leopold became king in 1865. He explained his goal for his reign in an 1888 letter addressed to his brother, Prince Philippe, Count of Flanders: "the country must be strong, prosperous, therefore have colonies of her own, beautiful and calm."

Leopold's reign was marked by a number of major political developments. The Liberals governed Belgium from 1857 to 1880, and during its final year in power legislated the Frère-Orban Law of 1879. This law created free, secular, compulsory primary schools supported by the state and withdrew all state support from Roman Catholic primary schools. The Catholic Party obtained a parliamentary majority in 1880, and four years later restored state support to Catholic schools. In 1885, various socialist and social democratic groups drew together and formed the Labour Party. Increasing social unrest and the rise of the Labour Party forced the adoption of universal male suffrage in 1893.

During Leopold's reign other social changes were enacted into law. Among these were the right of workers to form labour unions and the abolition of the livret d'ouvrier, an employment record book. Laws against child labour were passed. Children younger than 12 were not allowed to work in factories, children younger than 16 were not allowed to work at night, and women younger than 21 years old were not allowed to work underground. Workers gained the right to be compensated for workplace accidents and were given Sundays off.

The first revision of the Belgian Constitution came in 1893. Universal male suffrage was introduced, though the effect of this was tempered by plural voting. The eligibility requirements for the Senate were reduced, and elections would be based on a system of proportional representation, which continues to this day. Leopold pushed strongly to enable a royal referendum, whereby the king would have the power to consult the electorate directly on an issue, and use his veto according to the results of the referendum. The proposal was rejected, as it would have given the king the power to override the elected government. Leopold was so disappointed that he considered abdication.

Leopold emphasized military defence as the basis of neutrality, and strove to make Belgium less vulnerable militarily. He achieved the construction of defensive fortresses at Liège, at Namur and at Antwerp. During the Franco-Prussian War, he managed to preserve Belgium's neutrality in a period of unusual difficulty and danger. Leopold pushed for a reform in military service, but he was unable to obtain one until he was on his deathbed. The Belgian army was a combination of volunteers and a lottery, and it was possible for men to pay for substitutes for service. This was replaced by a system in which one son in every family would have to serve in the military.

Builder King

Leopold commissioned a great number of buildings, urban projects and public works, largely with the profits generated from exploitation of the Congo Free State. These projects earned him the epithet of "Builder King". The public buildings were mainly in Brussels, Ostend, Tervuren and Antwerp, and include the Parc du Cinquantenaire/Jubelpark, memorial arcade and complex, the Basilica of the Sacred Heart and Duden Park in Brussels; the Hippodrome Wellington racetrack, the Royal Galleries and Maria Hendrikapark in Ostend; the Royal Museum for Central Africa and its surrounding park in Tervuren; and Antwerpen-Centraal railway station in Antwerp.

In addition to his public works, Leopold acquired and built numerous private properties for himself inside and outside Belgium. He expanded the grounds of the Royal Castle of Laeken, and built the Royal Greenhouses, as well as the Japanese Tower and the Chinese Pavilion near the palace (now the Museums of the Far East). He also built important country estates on the French Riviera, including the Villa des Cèdres and its botanical garden, and the Villa Leopolda.

Thinking of the future after his death, Leopold did not want the collection of estates, lands and heritage buildings he had privately amassed to be scattered among his daughters, each of whom was married to a foreign prince. In 1900, he created the Royal Trust, by means of which he donated most of his properties to the Belgian nation in perpetuity, and arranged for the royal family to continue using them after his death.

Attempted assassination
On 15 November 1902, Italian anarchist Gennaro Rubino attempted to assassinate Leopold, who was riding in a royal cortege from a ceremony at Church of St. Michael and St. Gudula in memory of his recently deceased wife, Marie Henriette. After Leopold's carriage passed, Rubino fired three shots at the procession. The shots missed Leopold but almost killed the king's grand marshal, Count Charles John d'Oultremont. Rubino was immediately arrested and subsequently sentenced to life imprisonment. He died in prison in 1918.

The king replied after the attack to a senator: "My dear senator, if fate wants me shot, too bad!" ("Mon cher Sénateur, si la fatalité veut que je sois atteint, tant pis"!)
After the failed regicide, the king's security was questioned, because the glass of the landaus was 2 cm thick. Elsewhere in Europe, the news of this assassination attempt was received with alarm. Heads of state and the pope sent telegrams to the king congratulating him for surviving the assassination attempt.

The Belgians rejoiced that the king was safe. Later in the day, in the Royal Theatre of La Monnaie before Tristan und Isolde was performed, the orchestra played The Brabançonne, which was sung loudly and ended with loud cheers and applause.

Congo Free State

Leopold was the founder and sole owner of the Congo Free State, a private project undertaken on his own behalf. He used explorer Henry Morton Stanley to help him lay claim to the Congo, an area now known as the Democratic Republic of the Congo. At the Berlin Conference of 1884–1885, the colonial nations of Europe authorised his claim by committing the Congo Free State to improving the lives of the people.

From the beginning, Leopold ignored these conditions. He ran the Congo using the mercenary Force Publique for his personal enrichment. Failure to meet rubber collection quotas was punishable by death. Meanwhile, the Force Publique were required to provide the hand of their victims as proof when they had shot and killed someone, as it was believed that they would otherwise use the munitions (imported from Europe at considerable cost) for hunting. As a consequence, the rubber quotas were in part paid off in chopped-off hands. Leopold extracted a fortune from the Congo, initially by the collection of ivory, and after a rise in the price of rubber in the 1890s, by forced labour from the people to harvest and process rubber.

Under his regime, millions of Congolese inhabitants, including children, were mutilated, killed or died from disease and famine. In addition, the birth rate rapidly declined during this period. Estimates for the total population decline range from one million to fifteen million, with a consensus growing around 10 million. Several historians argue against this figure due to the absence of reliable censuses, the enormous mortality of diseases such as smallpox or sleeping sickness and the fact that there were only 175 administrative agents in charge of rubber exploitation.

Reports of deaths and abuse led to a major international scandal in the early 20th century, and Leopold was forced by the Belgian government to relinquish control of the colony to the civil administration in 1908.

Obtaining the Congo Free State

Leopold fervently believed that overseas colonies were the key to a country's greatness, and he worked tirelessly to acquire colonial territory for Belgium. He envisioned "our little Belgium" as the capital of a large overseas empire. Leopold eventually began to acquire a colony as a private citizen. The Belgian government lent him money for this venture.

During his reign, Leopold saw the empires of the Netherlands, Portugal, and Spain as being in a state of decline and expressed interest in buying their territories. In 1866, Leopold instructed the Belgian ambassador in Madrid to speak to Queen Isabella II of Spain about ceding the Philippines to Belgium. Knowing the situation fully, the ambassador did nothing. Leopold quickly replaced the ambassador with a more sympathetic individual to carry out his plan. In 1868, when Isabella II was deposed as queen of Spain, Leopold tried to press his original plan to acquire the Philippines. But without funds, he was unsuccessful. Leopold then devised another unsuccessful plan to establish the Philippines as an independent state, which could then be ruled by a Belgian. When both of these plans failed, Leopold shifted his aspirations of colonisation to Africa.

After numerous unsuccessful schemes to acquire colonies in Africa and Asia, in 1876 Leopold organized a private holding company disguised as an international scientific and philanthropic association, which he called the International African Society, or the International Association for the Exploration and Civilization of the Congo. In 1878, under the auspices of the holding company, he hired explorer Henry Stanley to explore and establish a colony in the Congo region. Much diplomatic maneuvering among European nations resulted in the Berlin Conference of 1884–1885 regarding African affairs, at which representatives of 14 European countries and the United States recognized Leopold as sovereign of most of the area to which he and Stanley had laid claim. On 5 February 1885, the Congo Free State, an area 76 times larger than Belgium, was established under Leopold II's personal rule and private army, the Force Publique.

Lado Enclave 

In 1894, King Leopold signed a treaty with Great Britain which conceded a strip of land on the Congo Free State's eastern border in exchange for the Lado Enclave, which provided access to the navigable Nile and extended the Free State's sphere of influence northwards into Sudan. After rubber profits soared in 1895, Leopold ordered the organization of an expedition into the Lado Enclave, which had been overrun by Mahdist rebels since the outbreak of the Mahdist War in 1881. The expedition was composed of two columns: the first, under Belgian Baron Dhanis, consisted of a sizable force, numbering around 3,000, and was to strike north through the jungle and attack the rebels at their base at Rejaf. The second, a much smaller force of 800, was led by Louis-Napoléon Chaltin and took the main road towards Rejaf. Both expeditions set out in December 1896.

Although Leopold had initially planned for the expedition to carry on much farther than the Lado Enclave, hoping indeed to take Fashoda and then Khartoum, Dhanis' column mutinied in February 1897, resulting in the death of several Belgian officers and the loss of his entire force. Nonetheless, Chaltin continued his advance, and on 17 February 1897, his outnumbered forces defeated the rebels in the Battle of Rejaf, securing the Lado Enclave as a Belgian territory until Leopold's death in 1909.

Exploitation, atrocities, and death toll

Leopold amassed a huge personal fortune by exploiting the natural resources of the Congo. At first, ivory was exported, but this did not yield the expected levels of revenue. When the global demand for rubber exploded, attention shifted to the labor-intensive collection of sap from rubber plants. Abandoning the promises of the Berlin Conference in the late 1890s, the Free State government restricted foreign access and extorted forced labor from the natives. Abuses, especially in the rubber industry, included forced labour of the native population, beatings, widespread killings, and frequent mutilation when production quotas were not met. Missionary John Harris of Baringa was so shocked by what he had encountered that he wrote to Leopold's chief agent in the Congo, saying:
I have just returned from a journey inland to the village of Insongo Mboyo. The abject misery and utter abandon is positively indescribable. I was so moved, Your Excellency, by the people's stories that I took the liberty of promising them that in future you will only kill them for crimes they commit.

Estimates of the death toll range from one million to fifteen million, since accurate records were not kept. Historians Louis and Stengers in 1968 stated that population figures at the start of Leopold's control are only "wild guesses", and that attempts by E. D. Morel and others to determine a figure for the loss of population were "but figments of the imagination".

Adam Hochschild devotes a chapter of his 1998 book King Leopold's Ghost to the problem of estimating the death toll. He cites several recent lines of investigation, by anthropologist Jan Vansina and others, that examine local sources (police records, religious records, oral traditions, genealogies, personal diaries, and "many others"), which generally agree with the assessment of the 1919 Belgian government commission: roughly half the population perished during the Free State period. Hochschild points out that since the first official census by the Belgian authorities in 1924 put the population at about 10 million, these various approaches suggest a rough estimate of a population decline by 10 million.

Smallpox epidemics and sleeping sickness also devastated the disrupted population. By 1896, African trypanosomiasis had killed up to 5,000 Africans in the village of Lukolela on the Congo River. The mortality statistics were collected through the efforts of British consul Roger Casement, who found, for example, only 600 survivors of the disease in Lukolela in 1903.

Criticism of the management of Congo

Inspired by works such as Joseph Conrad’s Heart of Darkness (1902), originally published as a three-part series in Blackwood’s Magazine (1899) and based on Conrad's experience as a steamer captain on the Congo 12 years earlier, international criticism of Leopold’s rule increased and mobilized. Reports of outrageous exploitation and widespread human rights abuses led the British Crown to appoint their consul Roger Casement to investigate conditions there. His extensive travels and interviews in the region resulted in the Casement Report, which detailed the extensive abuses under Leopold's regime. A widespread war of words ensued. In Britain, former shipping clerk E. D. Morel with Casement's support founded the Congo Reform Association, the first mass human rights movement. Supporters included American writer Mark Twain, whose stinging political satire entitled King Leopold's Soliloquy portrays the king arguing that bringing Christianity to the country outweighs a little starvation, and uses many of Leopold's own words against him.

Writer Arthur Conan Doyle also criticised the "rubber regime" in his 1908 work The Crime of the Congo, written to aid the work of the Congo Reform Association. Doyle contrasted Leopold's rule with British rule in Nigeria, arguing that decency required those who ruled primitive peoples to be concerned first with their uplift, not how much could be extracted from them. As Hochschild describes in King Leopold's Ghost, many of Leopold's policies, in particular those of colonial monopolies and forced labour, were influenced by Dutch practice in the East Indies. Similar methods of forced labour were employed to some degree by Germany, France, and Portugal where natural rubber occurred in their own colonies.

Relinquishment of the Congo

International opposition and criticism at home from the Catholic Party, Progressive Liberals and the Labour Party caused the Belgian Parliament to compel the king to cede the Congo Free State to Belgium in 1908. The deal that led to the handover cost Belgium the considerable sum of 215.5 million Francs. This was used to discharge the debt of the Congo Free State and to pay out its bond holders as well as 45.5 million for Leopold's pet building projects in Belgium and a personal payment of 50 million to him. The Congo Free State was transformed into a Belgian colony under parliamentary control known as the Belgian Congo. Leopold went to great lengths to conceal potential evidence of wrongdoing during his time as ruler of his private colony. The entire archive of the Congo Free State was burned and he told his aide that even though the Congo had been taken from him, "they have no right to know what I did there". The Congo was given independence in 1960.

Death and legacy

On 17 December 1909, Leopold II died at Laeken, and the Belgian crown passed to Albert I, the son of Leopold's brother, Philippe, Count of Flanders. His funeral cortege was booed by the crowd in expression of disapproval of his rule of the Congo. Leopold's reign of exactly 44 years remains the longest in Belgian history. He was interred in the royal vault at the Church of Our Lady of Laeken.

Attention to the Congo atrocities subsided in the years after Leopold's death. Statues of him were erected in the 1930s at the initiative of Albert I, while the Belgian government celebrated his accomplishments in Belgium. The debate over Leopold's legacy was reignited in 1999 with the publication of King Leopold's Ghost by American historian Adam Hochschild, which recounts Leopold's plan to acquire the colony, the exploitation, and the large death toll. The debate then periodically resurfaced over the following 20 years.

In 2010, Louis Michel, a Belgian member of the European Parliament and former Belgian foreign minister, called Leopold II a "visionary hero." According to Michel, "To use the word 'genocide' in relation to the Congo is absolutely unacceptable and inappropriate. ... maybe colonisation was domineering and acquiring more power, but at a certain moment, it brought civilisation." Michel's remarks were countered by several Belgian politicians. Senator Pol Van Den Driessche replied, "[A] great visionary? Absolutely not. What happened then was shameful. If we measured him against 21st century standards, it is likely that Leopold would be hauled before the International Criminal Court in The Hague."

In June 2020, a Black Lives Matter demonstration in Brussels protested the murder of George Floyd, causing Leopold II's legacy to become once again the subject of debate. MPs agreed to set up a parliamentary commission to examine Belgium's colonial past, a step likened to the Truth and Reconciliation Committee set up in South Africa after the apartheid regime was abolished. On 30 June, the 60th anniversary of the Democratic Republic of the Congo's independence, King Philippe released a statement expressing his "deepest regret" for the wounds of the colonial past, and the "acts of violence and cruelty committed" in the Congo during colonisation but did not explicitly mention Leopold's role in the atrocities. Some activists accused him of not making a full apology.

The greatest legacy of Leopold is in the transparent way in which his policy exposes the basic function of the modern State.

Statues 

 

Leopold II remains a controversial figure in the Democratic Republic of the Congo. In the capital Kinshasa (known until 1966 as Leopoldville in his honor) his statue was removed after independence. Congolese culture minister Christophe Muzungu decided to reinstate the statue in 2005. He noted that the beginning of the Free State had been a time of some economic and social progress. He argued that people should recognize some positive aspects of the king as well as the negative, but hours after the six-metre (20ft) statue was installed near Kinshasa's central station, it was officially removed.

Several statues have been erected to honour the legacy of Leopold II in Belgium. According to Professor of Colonial History Idesbald Goddeeris of Leuven University (2018), most of the statues date from the interwar period, the peak of colonial-patriotic propaganda. The monuments were supposed to help get rid of the scandal after international commotion about the atrocities in the Congo Free State during Leopold II's rule, and to raise people's enthusiasm for the colonial enterprise in Belgian Congo.

Leopold's controversial regime in the Congo Free State has motivated proposals for these statues to be removed. During the international George Floyd protests against racism (May–July 2020), several statues of Leopold II were vandalised, and petitions calling for the removal of some or all statues were signed by tens of thousands of Belgians. Other petitions, signed by hundreds, called for the statues to remain.

In early June 2020, a majority in the Brussels Parliament requested a committee to be set up to 'decolonise the public sphere' in the Brussels-Capital Region. From 9 June 2020 onwards, authorities in Belgium gave way to public pressure and began removing some of the statues of Leopold, beginning with ones in Ekeren in the municipality of Antwerp and in the Warocqué Faculty of Economics and Management of the University of Mons on that day.

Family

Leopold's sister became the Empress Carlota of Mexico. His first cousins included both Queen Victoria of the United Kingdom and her husband Prince Albert, as well as King Fernando II of Portugal.

He had four children with Queen Marie Henriette, of whom the youngest two have descendants living :
 Princess Louise of Belgium, born in Brussels on 18 February 1858, and died at Wiesbaden on 1 March 1924. She married Prince Philipp of Saxe-Coburg and Gotha on 4 February 1875, they had two children and divorced on 15 January 1906.
 Prince Leopold, Duke of Brabant, Count of Hainaut (as eldest son of the heir apparent), later Duke of Brabant (as heir apparent), born at Laeken on 12 June 1859, and died at Laeken on 22 January 1869, from pneumonia, after falling into a pond.
 Princess Stéphanie of Belgium, born at Laeken on 21 May 1864, and died at the Archabbey of Pannonhalma in Győr-Moson-Sopron, Hungary, on 23 August 1945. She married (1) Crown Prince Rudolf of Austria, the heir apparent to the throne of Austria-Hungary. In 1889, he died in a suicide pact with his mistress, Baroness Mary Vetsera, at the Mayerling hunting lodge.  Stéphanie's second husband was (2) Elemér Edmund Graf Lónyay de Nagy-Lónya et Vásáros-Namény (created, in 1917, Prince Lónyay de Nagy-Lónya et Vásáros-Namény).
 Princess Clémentine of Belgium, born at Laeken on 30 July 1872, and died at Nice on 8 March 1955. She married Prince Napoléon Victor Jérôme Frédéric Bonaparte (1862–1926), head of the Bonaparte family. The current head of the Imperial family, Jean-Christophe, Prince Napoléon is a direct descendant of King Leopold II.

Leopold also fathered two sons by Caroline Lacroix. They were adopted in 1910 by Lacroix's second husband, Antoine Durrieux. Leopold granted them courtesy titles that were honorary, as the parliament would not have supported any official act or decree:
 Lucien Philippe Marie Antoine (9 February 1906 – 15 November 1984)
 Philippe Henri Marie François (16 October 1907 – 21 August 1914)

Ancestry

See also

 Abir Congo Company
 Atrocities in the Congo Free State
 Émile Banning
 Congo Free State propaganda war
 Crown Council of Belgium
 Kings of Belgium family tree

References

Bibliography

 Ascherson, Neal: The King Incorporated, Allen & Unwin, 1963.  (1999 Granta edition).
 Aronson, Theo: Defiant Dynasty: The Coburgs of Belgium, Bobbs-Merrill, 1968.
 Emerson, Barbara: Leopold II of the Belgians, Weidenfeld & Nicolson, 1979, .
 Hochschild, Adam: King Leopold’s Ghost: A Story of Greed, Terror, and Heroism in Colonial Africa, Mariner Books, 1998. .
 Petringa, Maria: Brazza, A Life for Africa, 2006. 
 Wm. Roger Louis and Jean Stengers: E.D. Morel's History of the Congo Reform Movement, Clarendon Press Oxford, 1968.
 Ó Síocháin, Séamas and Michael O’Sullivan, eds: The Eyes of Another Race: Roger Casement's Congo Report and 1903 Diary. University College Dublin Press, 2004. .
 Ó Síocháin, Séamas: Roger Casement: Imperialist, Rebel, Revolutionary. Dublin: Lilliput Press, 2008.
 
 Stanard, Matthew G.  Selling the Congo: A history of European pro-empire propaganda and the making of Belgian imperialism (U of Nebraska Press, 2012)
 
 Vanthemsche, Guy (2012). Belgium and the Congo, 1885–1980 (Cambridge UP).
 Vanthemsche, Guy (2006) 'The historiography of Belgian colonialism in the Congo"  in C Levai ed., Europe and the World in European Historiography (Pisa University Press), pp. 89–119. online
 Viaene, Vincent. "King Leopold's imperialism and the origins of the Belgian colonial party, 1860–1905." Journal of Modern History 80.4 (2008): 741–90.

External links

 Archive Léopold II, Royal museum of central Africa
 Official biography from the Belgian Royal Family website
 "The Political Economy of Power" Interview with political scientist Bruce Bueno de Mesquita, with a discussion of Leopold halfway through
 Interview with King Leopold II Publishers' Press, 1906
 Mass crimes against humanity in the Congo Free State
 Congo: White king, red rubber, black death A 2003 documentary by Peter Bate on Leopold II and the Congo
 The Crime of the Congo, 1909, Sir Arthur Conan Doyle, Archive.org
 
 
 
 
 
 
 
 

|-

 
1835 births
1909 deaths
19th-century Belgian monarchs
20th-century Belgian monarchs
Belgian monarchs
Dukes of Brabant
House of Saxe-Coburg and Gotha (Belgium)
Nobility from Brussels
Congo Free State
Burials at the Church of Our Lady of Laeken

Grand Crosses of the Royal Order of the Lion
Grand Crosses of the Order of the Crown (Belgium)
Recipients of the Grand Cross of the Order of Leopold II

Knights of the Golden Fleece of Austria
Grand Crosses of the Order of Saint Stephen of Hungary
Grand Croix of the Légion d'honneur
Knights Grand Cross of the Order of Saints Maurice and Lazarus
Knights Grand Cross of the Royal Order of Cambodia
Bailiffs Grand Cross of Honour and Devotion of the Sovereign Military Order of Malta
Grand Crosses of the Order of Saint-Charles
Recipients of the Order of the Netherlands Lion
3
3
3
Human rights abuses in the Democratic Republic of the Congo
Recipients of the Order of the White Eagle (Russia)
Recipients of the Order of St. Anna, 1st class
Recipients of the Order of the Cross of Takovo
Extra Knights Companion of the Garter
Articles containing video clips
Political controversies in Belgium